Eros Media World plc (formerly ErosSTX Global Corporation) is an Indian media company that acquires, produces, and distributes films, television shows, and digital content.

The company is led by executive chairperson Rishika Lulla Singh.

History
Eros International plc was founded by Arjan Lulla and Kishore Lulla in 1977 as an Indian film and television production and distribution company. The company launched its ErosNow OTT service in 2012, which by 2020 had 36.2 million paid subscribers and the largest library of Indian content in the world. Eros International plc became the first Indian media company to list on the Alternative Investment Market (AIM) of the London Stock Exchange. Subsequently, the company delisted from AIM in November 2013 to list on the New York Stock Exchange.

STX Entertainment was founded by Robert Simonds and Bill McGlashan in 2014 as an American mini-major film, television, and digital media studio.  By April 2020, STX had released 34 films, which earned over US$1.5 billion in global box office, with hits including Bad Moms, Hustlers, and The Upside.

After first being announced in April 2020, the merger of Eros International and STX Entertainment was completed on July 30, 2020, with the company now called ErosSTX Global Corporation. The merged company is publicly traded on the New York Stock Exchange, with the combined firm listed as ESGC.

On 7 December 2021, Jahm Najafi's Najafi Companies announced that it had reached an agreement to acquire STX Entertainment from ErosSTX for US$173 million. The deal is subject to a 45-day period where ErosSTX may solicit other offers; if ErosSTX declines the offer, it must pay a $4.5 million breakup fee. Lionsgate also emerged as a potential suitor, but it was rejected on 10 March 2022, leaving Najafi as the only suitor left. The sale was closed in April 2022, effectively splitting STX from ErosSTX and making it an independent studio again.

Shortly after the sale of STX, ErosSTX announced their rebrand to Eros Media World plc, with some changes in management and reduced debt following STX's sale. Eros Media World would, however, retain a 15% stake in STX. Rishika Lulla Singh was named executive chairman, with Pradeep Dwivedi acting as the new CEO and Rajesh Chalke being stated as the new CFO of the company. he company will focus on its content library and film studio Eros International, as well as Eros Now and Eros Music. As part of the refinance and sale, UK bondholders agreed to an extension of the retail bond, however Eros were unable to pay the interest payment on the bond as it became due in October 2022, casting doubt on the viability of the new company. By this time Eros were due to be forcibly delisted from the New York Stock Exchange and in January 2023 they announced they would not appeal the delisting as they were unable to file accounts.

Management
Rishika Lulla Singh serves as ErosSTX's executive chairperson, Pradeep Dwivedi as CEO and Rajesh Chalke as CFO.

ErosSTX's board of directors is composed of Kishore Lulla, Rishika Singh, Dhirendra Swarup, and Dilip Thakkar.

References

External links

Companies listed on the New York Stock Exchange
American companies established in 2020
Indian companies established in 2020
Mass media companies established in 2020
Entertainment companies established in 2020
Film distributors of India
Film distributors of the United States
Entertainment companies based in California
Entertainment companies of India
American brands
Indian brands
American film studios
Indian film studios
2020 establishments in Maharashtra
STX Entertainment